Riccardo Nobili (1859 in Florence – 1939 in Venice) was an Italian painter, writer, and antiquarian.

Biography
Nobili was born in Florence but moved to Paris as an adult. His mother, Elena Nobili (born 1833), was a painter. He studied painting at the Academy of Fine Arts of Florence under Antonio Ciseri and Telemaco Signorini, attending also the  Scuola Libera del Nudo. In Paris, he frequented the l’Académie Julian. He specialized in Genre painting. He exhibited at Livorno, in 1886, the small canvases Pioggia e In birreria, and at the 1887 Società Promotrice, he displayed the nostalgic vedute of La piazza del Vecchio Mercato, Florence, a view of a neighborhood destroyed during the urban renewal of the late 19th-century. Among other works are: L'amor mio verrà dal mare. In 1938, he painted a portrait of Gioconda Mary Hulton (1887–1940) found at Attingham Park in England.

Nobili also became a novelist and a writer on the subject of art forgeries. His novel A Modern Antique: A Florentine Story documents events surrounding an appraiser of Italian Renaissance works. He is better remembered for his text on the Gentle art of faking; a history of the methods of producing imitations & spurious works of art from the earliest times to the present (1922)

In 1933, Nobili married Grace Cleveland Porter (1880-1953), the daughter of Mr. and Mrs. William Dodge Porter, and the grand-niece of President Grover Cleveland. She volunteered in Italy during World War I as a nurse with the Red Cross in an Italian hospital, and as Director of Recreation Services in Italian War Hospitals in Rome under the auspices of the YMCA. She wrote Negro Folk Singing Games and Folk Games of the Habitants and Mammina Graziosa (1916). Nobili received awards and decorations from the Italian government for her war service. Owing to her extraordinary service to Italy, despite being a Protestant, she was granted special permission to be buried next to her husband in the family chapel near Florence. Her papers were left to Smith College.

References

External links
 

1859 births
1939 deaths
Painters from Florence
19th-century Italian painters
Italian male painters
20th-century Italian painters
Italian antiquarians
Accademia di Belle Arti di Firenze alumni
19th-century Italian male artists
20th-century Italian male artists